Tanzania–Turkey relations are the foreign relations between Tanzania and Turkey. The Turkish embassy in Dar es Salaam first opened in 1979, although the Ottoman Empire had previously opened a consulate in Zanzibar, now a part of Tanzania, on March 17, 1837.

Diplomatic relations 

Turkey had friendly relations with Tanzania under the founding president Julius Nyerere, who cooperated with Turkey in opposing colonialism and apartheid in Africa. The relations became cooler when Julius Nyerere allowed Che Guevera to use Tanzania during his failed intervention in the Congolese civil war.

After Julius Nyerere’s retirement, relations with Tanzania improved because of Tanzania's progress in democratization and social progress.

Economic relations 
 Trade volume between the two countries was 151 million USD in 2015.
 There are direct flights from Istanbul to Dar es Salaam and  Kilimanjaro since December 4, 2012.

See also 

 Foreign relations of Tanzania
 Foreign relations of Turkey

References

Further reading 
 Barkan, Joel D. Beyond Capitalism vs. Socialism in Kenya and Tanzania. Boul- der, Colo.: Lynne Rienner, 1994. 
 De Waal, Alexander, ed. Islamism and Its Enemies in the Horn of Africa. Bloomington: Indiana University Press, 2004. 
 Farer, Tom J. War Clouds on the Horn of Africa: A Crisis for Détente. New York: Carnegie Endowment for International Peace, 1979. 
 Habte Selassie, Bereket. Conflict and Intervention in the Horn of Africa. New York: Monthly Review, 1980. 
 Henze, Paul. “Ethiopia and Eritrea: The Defeat of the Derg and the Establishment of New Governments.” In David R. Smock, ed. Making War and Waging Peace: Foreign Intervention in Africa. Washington, D.C.: United States Institute of Peace Press, 1993. 
 Kaplan, Robert D. Surrender or Starve: The Wars behind the Famine. Boulder, Colo.: Westview, 1988. 
 Lefebvre, Jeffrey A. Arms for the Horn: U.S. Security Policy in Ethiopia and Somalia, 1953–1991. Pittsburgh, Pa.: University of Pittsburgh Press, 1991. 
 Nyerere, Julius. Ujamaa: Essays on Socialism. New York: Oxford University Press, 1968. 
 Ottaway, Marina. Soviet and American Influence in the Horn of Africa. Westport, Conn.: Praeger, 1982. 
 Patman, Robert G. The Soviet Union in the Horn of Africa: The Diplomacy of Intervention and Disengagements. New York: Cambridge University Press, 1990. 
 U.S. Foreign Policy and the Horn of Africa. Burlington, Vt.: Ashgate, 2006. 
 War Clouds on the Horn of Africa: The Widening Storm. New York: Carnegie Endowment for International Peace, 1979.
 Wilson, Amrit. U.S. Foreign Policy and Revolution: The Creation of Tanzania. London: Pluto Press, 2009. 
 Woodward, Peter. The Horn of Africa: Politics and International Relations. London: I.B. Tauris, 2002. 
 

-
Turkey
Bilateral relations of Turkey